Otto Winter-Hjelm (8 October 1837 – 3 May 1931) was a Norwegian musician, conductor, writer, composer and music critic.

Life and career
Otto Winther-Hjelm was born in Christiana (Oslo), and studied in Leipzig and Berlin. During his career, he became a leading force in Norwegian music, establishing a music school in 1864 and founding the music Conservatory in Christiana with Edvard Grieg in 1866. He also served as organist for the Trinity Church in Oslo from 1874 to 1921 and music critic for Aftenposten from 1887 to 1913. Winter-Hjelm composed two symphonies and a number of cantata and songs for male chorus.

Works (selection)

 Waltz (1856)
 Piano Trio (whilst studying with Arnold; 1860)
 Overture voor orchestra (1861)
 Symphony No. 1 in B flat major (1862)
 Symphony No. 2 in B minor (1863)
 Ho Åstrid, song on a text of Kristofer Janson (1870)
 Til Halfdan Kjerulfs Minne (1870)
 Fjukande skyer, song (1870)
 12 Sangstudier (1871)
 Fifty Psalms for piano or harmonium (1872)
 Til Hans Gude for piano (1872)
 Luther Cantata for choir and orchestra (1883)
 Lyset, University cantata on a text of Bjørnstjerne Bjørnson (1897)

References

1837 births
1931 deaths
19th-century classical composers
19th-century Norwegian composers
20th-century classical composers
20th-century Norwegian composers
Edvard Grieg
Norwegian classical composers
Norwegian Romantic composers